Epinotia trigonella, the birch epinotia moth, is a species of moth of the family Tortricidae. It is found in most of Europe, east to the eastern Palearctic realm. It is also found in North America.

The wingspan is 16–21 mm. The forewings are dark grey-brown with two large white spots at the dorsal edge. The hindwings are light grey-brown. 
Adults are on wing from August to September.

The larvae feed on Betula species. They feed between folded or spun leaves of their host plant.

References

External links

Eucosmini
Moths described in 1758
Moths of Asia
Moths of Europe
Moths of North America
Taxa named by Carl Linnaeus